Abdulrashid Bulachevich Sadulaev (born 9 May 1996) is a Russian freestyle wrestler who competes at 97 kilograms and formerly competed at 86 kilograms. Sadulaev is widely regarded as the most dominant active freestyle wrestler in the world.

Nicknamed the "Russian Tank," he is a two time Olympic gold medalist and the 2020 Olympic Champion at 97 kg and the 2016 Olympic Champion at 86 kg, a five–time World Champion (2014, 2015, 2018, 2019, 2021), the Individual World Cup champion (2020), a four–time European Continental Champion (2014, 2018, 2019, 2020), Ivan Yarygin Grand Prix winner (2014, 2018) a two-time European Games Champion (2015, 2019) and a two–time Cadet World Champion (2012, 2013).

Background and personal life
Sadulaev was born in 1996 in the village of Tsurib, Charodinsky District, Dagestan, Russia. He belongs to the Avar ethnic group, he is from a devout Sunni Muslim family and is the youngest of four siblings. He did not start wrestling seriously until the age of 13, but quickly won a regional title and 300 ₽ ($4.69). After finishing the eleventh grade, he began training in the Gamid Gamidov Wrestling Club in Makhachkala, Dagestan's sports school of Olympic reserve. When he was 16 years old, he won his first World title in the cadet level in 2012. Sadulaev only has two social networking accounts, on Instagram and on VK. He stated that as he has no account on Twitter, other accounts existing there using his identity must be fake.

Career

2014: World Champion, European Champion
Sadulaev's senior level debut was at the XLIII Ali Aliyev Memorial when he was 16 years old. He was defeated in the semifinals by Shamil Kudiyamagomedov, but ended up winning the bronze medal. At the 2014 Russian National Championships, Sadulaev defeated Kudiyamagomedov and won his first national title. After the Russian Nationals, he participated at the 2014 World Wrestling Championships, where Sadulaev defeated Reineris Salas of Cuba 11–0 by technical fall.

2015: World Champion
On 8 May 2015, Sadulaev won the Russian Freestyle Wrestling Nationals again and took part in the European Games in Baku, Azerbaijan, and World Championships in Las Vegas, Nevada. In the Games he outscored four opponents 42–1 (4–0) by technical fall and won gold medal. On 11 September 2015, he won World Championships, in the final knocking down Koloi Kartoev (Selim Yaşar) of Turkey, overall scoring 47–2 (6–0) in the championships. As a result, he was given a Mercedes-Benz G-Class G63 and Toyota Land Cruiser 200 by Dagestani business magnate Gadzhiev brothers and Ziyavudin Magomedov.

Sadulaev faced on 7 November wrestlers from Belarus, Turkey, Azerbaijan, Georgia and Poland at the European Nations Cup (Alrosa Cup). He beat number one Georgian wrestler Elizbar Odikadze via technical fall (11–0).

2016: Olympic Champion
On 29 January, Sadulaev was expected to participate at the international tournament Golden Grand-Prix Ivan Yarygin 2016, but he pulled out in late January citing a minor shoulder injury.

Sadulaev returned to wrestling in the U23 European Championships in Ruse, Bulgaria on 3 April, and then he participated at the Wenceslas Ziolkowski Memorial XXV on 18 June 2016. At the European Championships he defeated Stefan Reichmuth of Switzerland in the eightfinals, Hungarian Gergely Gyrits in the quarterfinals, Belarusian Aliaksandr Hushtyn in the semifinals and finally Georgian Irakli Mtsituri; all victories were by technical superiority. On 18 June, Sadulaev won the Wenceslas Ziolkowski Memorial LII, beating Aleksey Mushtin, teammate Omargadzhi Magomedov, István Veréb of Hungary, Sebastian Jezierzanski and Zbigniew Baranowski, both from Poland, by technical superiority.

Sadulaev competed at the 2016 Summer Olympics without Russian Olympic Trials, that news was announced by the head coach of the Russian freestyle wrestling team Dzhambolat Tedeyev. Sadualev beat István Veréb by technical superiority, then Pedro Ceballos of Venezuela by points, fellow countryman Sharif Sharifov of Azerbaijan and in the gold medal match Selim Yasar, 5–0.

After Sadulaev's return to Russia, he was greeted by a rowdy welcome victory in Moscow. The Olympic athletes were also given a reception of the Russian medalists in the Kremlin, with the traditional ceremonial meeting being presided by President Vladimir Putin. The champions received BMW luxury crossovers, with the BMW X6 luxury crossovers being awarded for the gold medalists. Sadulaev was also greeted as a national hero in his native Dagestan. Aside from receiving financial reward for his Olympic achievements, Dagestan's Head of the Region Ramazan Abdulatipov presented Sadulaev an Akhal-Teke horse (native to Turkmenistan), which has a reputation for having speed, endurance and intelligence, and is highly valued in Dagestan.

2017: Weight class changes, WC runner-up, European Champion

Sadulaev competed in the Russian Nationals, defeating 2011 European runner-up Vladislav Baitcaev by decision (8–7). Sadulaev became the new Russian national champion in the 97 kg weight category. Before the final match he easily beat Yuri Belonovskiy, Umar Kudliev, Stanislav Gadzhiev and Tamerlan Rasuev by technical superiority. As a result, Ingushetian president Yunus-bek Yevkurov bestowed him a Toyota Land Cruiser 200.

At the World Championships, Sadulaev participated in the 97 kg weight category. En route he defeated Reineris Salas, Mateusz Filipczak, Elizbar Odikadze and Georgy Ketoyev. In the final he lost to Kyle Snyder in a close match.

2018: World Champion, rematch against Snyder
After that he debuted in the weight category 92 kg at the Golden Grand Prix Ivan Yarygin 2018. In the final match, he beat 2012 Olympian and countryman Anzor Urishev.

On 3 August 2018, Sadulaev won his fourth national title at the Russian Nationals, knocking down Vladislav Baitcaev for gold by score (8–1).

Sadulaev was chosen to represent Russia in his weight class for the World Championships in Budapest, Hungary, facing countrymen Magomedgadzhi Nurov, Mamed Ibragimov, Magomed Ibragimov, who he all beat by technical fall. In the semi-final he defeated Elizbar Odikadze from Georgia, and in the final in a rematch he faced American Kyle Snyder, finishing him down by pin fall.

2019: European Games gold medalist and World Championships
Sadulaev won European Games in Minsk, Belarus where he didn't give up a single point. After made world team trials, he repeated the success of last year at the world championships in Nur-Sultan, Kazakhstan, in the final match he beat Azerbhaijan's Sharif Sharifov by score (4–0). The rematch against USA's Kyle Snyder did not take place due to the loss of the American to Sharif Sharifov in the semifinals.

2020

In 2020, he won the gold medal in the men's 97 kg event at the 2020 Individual Wrestling World Cup held in Belgrade, Serbia.

2021
Sadulaev clinched gold at the 2020 Summer Olympics by defeating his rival Snyder in the final. For that achievement, a member of the Russian State Duma rewarded him with a $1 million. Sadulaev once again defeated his rival Snyder to claim gold at the 2021 World Wrestling Championships.

Championships and accomplishments
2012 Cadet World Champion – 76 kg
2012 Ali Aliyev Memorial Bronze Medalist – 84 kg
2013 Cadet World Champion – 85 kg
2013 Heydar Aliyev Memorial Bronze Medalist – 84 kg
2014 Golden Grand Prix Ivan Yarygin – 86 kg
2014 Golden Grand-Prix Yaşar Doğu – 86 kg
2014, 2015 Russian National Freestyle Wrestling Champion – 86 kg
2014 European Champion – 86 kg
2014 Wenceslas Ziolkowski Memorial XXIII – 86 kg
2014 World Champion – 86 kg
2015 Alexander Medved International – 86 kg
2015 European Games – 86 kg
2015 World Champion  – 86 kg
2015 European Nations Cup (Moscow Lights-Alrosa Cup) – 97 kg
2016 European Championships U23  – 86 kg
2016 Wenceslas Ziolkowski Memorial LII – 86 kg
2016 Summer Olympics  – 86 kg
2017 Russian National Freestyle Wrestling Champion – 97 kg
2017 World Championships Silver Medalist – 97 kg
2018 Golden Grand-Prix Ivan Yarygin – 92 kg
2018 Dan Kolov & Nikola Petrov international – 92 kg
2018 World Champion – 97 kg
2019 European Champion – 97 kg
2019 European Games Champion – 97 kg
2019 World Champion – 97 kg
2020 European Champion – 97 kg
2020 Russian National Freestyle Wrestling Champion – 97 kg
2020 Summer Olympics  – 97 kg
2021 World Champion – 97 kg

Freestyle wrestling record

!  Res.
!  Record
!  Opponent
!  Score
!  Date
!  Event
!  Location
|-
|Win
|144–2
|align=left| Magomedgaji Nurov
|style="font-size:88%"|5–1
|style="font-size:88%"|2 December 2021 
|style="font-size:88%"|2021 Alrosa Cup
|style="text-align:left;font-size:88%;"| Moscow
|-
|Win
|143–2
|align=left| Kyle Snyder
|style="font-size:88%"|6–0
|style="font-size:88%"|5 October 2021 
|style="font-size:88%" rowspan=4|2021 World Wrestling Championships
|style="text-align:left;font-size:88%;" rowspan=4| Oslo
|-
|Win
|142–2
|align=left| Mahamed Zakariiev
|style="font-size:88%"|TF 11–0
|style="font-size:88%" rowspan=3|4 October 2021 
|-
|Win
|141–2
|align=left| Aliaksandr Hushtyn
|style="font-size:88%"|9–4
|-
|Win
|140–2
|align=left| Takashi Ishiguro
|style="font-size:88%"|TF 10–0
|-
|Win
|139–2
|align=left| Kyle Snyder
|style="font-size:88%"|6–3
|style="font-size:88%"|7 August 2021 
|style="font-size:88%" rowspan=4|2020 Summer Olympics
|style="text-align:left;font-size:88%;" rowspan=4| Tokyo
|-
|Win
|138–2
|align=left| Reineris Salas
|style="font-size:88%"|4–0
|style="font-size:88%" rowspan=3|6 August 2021 
|-
|Win
|137–2
|align=left| Elizbar Odikadze
|style="font-size:88%"|TF 10–0
|-
|Win
|136–2
|align=left| Sharif Sharifov
|style="font-size:88%"|5–0
|-
|Loss
|
|align=left| Magomed Ibragimov
|style="font-size:88%"|Forfeit
|style="font-size:88%" rowspan=4|25 June 2021
|style="font-size:88%" rowspan=4|2021 Ali Aliev Memorial
|style="text-align:left;font-size:88%;" rowspan=5| Kaspiysk
|-
|Win
|135–2
|align=left| Vladislav Baitcaev
|style="font-size:88%"|5–1
|-
|Win
|134–2
|align=left| Magomedkhan Magomedov
|style="font-size:88%"|9–6
|-
|Win
|133–2
|align=left| Mojtaba Goleij
|style="font-size:88%"|4–0
|-
|Win
|132–2
|align=left| David Kabisov
|style="font-size:88%"|TF 12–2
|-
|Win
|131–2
|align=left| Aliaksandr Hushtyn
|style="font-size:88%"|Forfeit 
|style="font-size:88%"|18 December 2020
|style="font-size:88%" rowspan=4|2020 Individual World Cup
|style="text-align:left;font-size:88%;" rowspan=4| Belgrade
|-
|Win
|130–2
|align=left| Valeriy Andriytsev
|style="font-size:88%"|TF 12–1
|style="font-size:88%" rowspan=3|17 December 2020
|-
|Win
|129–2
|align=left| Radosław Baran
|style="font-size:88%"|TF 12–2
|-
|Win
|128–2
|align=left| Süleyman Karadeniz
|style="font-size:88%"|8–0
|-
|Win
|127–2
|align=left| Aslanbek Sotiev
|style="font-size:88%"|8–2
|style="font-size:88%" rowspan=4|18 October 2020
|style="font-size:88%" rowspan=4|2020 Russian Nationals
|style="text-align:left;font-size:88%;" rowspan=4| Naro-Fominsk
|-
|Win
|126–2
|align=left| Rasul Magomedov
|style="font-size:88%"|TF 10–0
|-
|Win
|125–2
|align=left| David Dzugaev
|style="font-size:88%"|TF 10–0
|-
|Win
|124–2
|align=left| Erik Dzhioev
|style="font-size:88%"|TF 15–2
|-
|Win
|123–2
|align=left| Albert Saritov
|style="font-size:88%"|6–0
|style="font-size:88%" |15 February 2020
|style="font-size:88%" rowspan=5|2020 European Championships
|style="text-align:left;font-size:88%;" rowspan=5| Rome
|-
|Win
|122–2
|align=left| Elizbar Odikadze
|style="font-size:88%"|6–0
|style="font-size:88%" rowspan=4|14 February 2020
|-
|Win
|121–2
|align=left| Nurmagomed Gadzhiev
|style="font-size:88%"|10–4
|-
|Win
|120–2
|align=left| İbrahim Bölükbaşı
|style="font-size:88%"|9–4
|-
|Win
|119–2
|align=left| Magomedgadzhi Nurov
|style="font-size:88%"|8–2
|-
|Win
|118–2
|align=left| Sharif Sharifov
|style="font-size:88%"|4–0
|style="font-size:88%" |22 September 2019
|style="font-size:88%" rowspan=4|2019 World Championships
|style="text-align:left;font-size:88%;" rowspan=4| Nur-Sultan
|-
|Win
|117–2
|align=left| Alisher Yergali
|style="font-size:88%"|8–1
|style="font-size:88%" rowspan=3|21 September 2019
|-
|Win
|116–2
|align=left| Magomedgadzhi Nurov
|style="font-size:88%"|6–0
|-
|Win
|115–2
|align=left| Nicolae Ceban
|style="font-size:88%"|Tech Fall
|-
|Win
|114–2
|align=left| Vladislav Baitcaev
|style="font-size:88%"|Tech Fall
|style="font-size:88%" |16 August 2019
|style="font-size:88%" |2019 Russian World Team Wrestle-offs
|style="font-size:88%" | Sochi, Krasnodar Krai
|-
|Win
|113–2
|align=left| Nurmagomed Gadzhiev
|style="font-size:88%"|Injury
|style="font-size:88%" |27 June 2019
|style="font-size:88%" rowspan=4|2019 European Games
|style="text-align:left;font-size:88%;" rowspan=4| Minsk
|-
|Win
|112–2
|align=left| Aliaksandr Hushtyn
|style="font-size:88%"|6–0
|style="font-size:88%" rowspan=3|26 June 2019
|-
|Win
|111–2
|align=left| Magomedgadzhi Nurov
|style="font-size:88%"|6–0
|-
|Win
|110–2
|align=left| Mihaly Szabo
|style="font-size:88%"|Tech Fall
|-
|Win
|109–2
|align=left| Aliaksandr Hushtyn
|style="font-size:88%"|3–1
|style="font-size:88%"|9 April 2019
|style="font-size:88%" rowspan=4|2019 European Championships
|style="text-align:left;font-size:88%;" rowspan=4| Bucharest
|-
|Win
|108–2
|align=left| Magomedgadzhi Nurov
|style="font-size:88%"|Tech.Fall; 4:39
|style="font-size:88%" rowspan=3|8 April 2019
|-
|Win
|107–2
|align=left| Gennadij Cudinovic
|style="font-size:88%"|Tech.Fall; 0:21
|-
|Win
|106–2
|align=left| Nurmagomed Gadzhiev
|style="font-size:88%"|3–0
|-
|Win
|105–2
|align=left| Kyle Snyder
|style="font-size:88%"|Fall; 1:10
|style="font-size:88%" |23 October 2018
|style="font-size:88%" rowspan=5|2018 World Championships
|style="text-align:left;font-size:88%;" rowspan=5| Budapest
|-
|Win
|104–2
|align=left| Elizbar Odikadze
|style="font-size:88%"|Tech.Fall; 2:35
|style="font-size:88%" rowspan=4|22 October 2018
|-
|Win
|103–2
|align=left| Magomed Ibragimov
|style="font-size:88%"|Tech.Fall; 4:51
|-
|Win
|102–2
|align=left| Mamed Ibragimov
|style="font-size:88%"|Tech.Fall; 3:23
|-
|Win
|101–2
|align=left| Magomedgadzhi Nurov 
|style="font-size:88%"|Tech.Fall; 1:42
|-
|Win
|100–2
|align=left| Vladislav Baitcaev
|style="font-size:88%"|8–1
|style="font-size:88%" rowspan=4|3 August 2018
|style="font-size:88%" rowspan=4|2018 Russian Nationals
|style="text-align:left;font-size:88%;" rowspan=4| Odintsovo, Moscow Oblast
|-
|Win
|99–2
|align=left| Batraz Gazzaev
|style="font-size:88%"|11–2
|-
|Win
|98–2
|align=left| Georgy Gogaev
|style="font-size:88%"|Tech. Fall
|-
|Win
|97–2
|align=left| Zaynulla Kurbanov
|style="font-size:88%"|5–0
|-
|Win
|96–2
|align=left| Sharif Sharifov
|style="font-size:88%"|2–1
|style="font-size:88%" rowspan=4|5 May 2018
|style="font-size:88%" rowspan=4|2018 European Championships
|style="text-align:left;font-size:88%;" rowspan=4| Kaspiysk
|-
|Win
|95–2
|align=left| Irakli Mtsituri
|style="font-size:88%"|Tech. Fall; 5:10
|-
|Win
|94–2
|align=left| Kyrylo Mieshkov
|style="font-size:88%"|Tech. Fall; 3:39
|-
|Win
|93–2
|align=left| Dominic Peter
|style="font-size:88%"|Tech. Fall; 3:15
|-
|Win
|92–2
|align=left| Irakli Mtsituri
|style="font-size:88%"|Tech. Fall; 3:36
|style="font-size:88%" rowspan=4|23 March 2018
|style="font-size:88%" rowspan=4|Nikola Petrov and Dan Kolov international
|style="text-align:left;font-size:88%;" rowspan=4| Sofia
|-
|Win
|91–2
|align=left| Ivan Yankouski
|style="font-size:88%"|Tech. Fall; 3:25
|-
|Win
|90–2
|align=left| Pavel Oleynik
|style="font-size:88%"|Tech. Fall; 4:44
|-
|Win
|89–2
|align=left| Nicolae Ceban
|style="font-size:88%"|6–0
|-
|Win
|88–2
|align=left| Anzor Urishev
|style="font-size:88%"|6–0
|style="font-size:88%" rowspan=3|28 January 2018
|style="font-size:88%" rowspan=3|Golden Grand Prix Ivan Yarygin 2018
|style="text-align:left;font-size:88%;" rowspan=3| Krasnoyarsk
|-
|Win
|87–2
|align=left| Nicholas Heflin
|style="font-size:88%"|Tech. Fall; 2:17
|-
|Win
|86–2
|align=left| Turtogtokh Luvsandorj
|style="font-size:88%"|Tech. Fall; 1:26
|-
|Win
|85–2
|align=left| Abzar Eslami
|style="font-size:88%"|Tech. Fall
|style="font-size:88%" rowspan=2|7 December 2017
|style="font-size:88%" rowspan=2|World Clubs Cup 2017
|style="text-align:left;font-size:88%;" rowspan=2| Teheran
|-
|Win
|84–2
|align=left| Alisher Yergali
|style="font-size:88%"|Fall
|-
|Loss
|83–2
|align=left| Kyle Snyder
|style="font-size:88%"|6–5
|style="font-size:88%" rowspan=5|26 August 2017 
|style="font-size:88%" rowspan=5|2017 World Championships
|style="text-align:left;font-size:88%;" rowspan=5| Paris
|-
|Win
|83–1
|align=left| Georgy Ketoyev
|style="font-size:88%"|2–0
|-
|Win
|82–1
|align=left| Elizbar Odikadze
|style="font-size:88%"|Tech. Fall; 4:59
|-
|Win
|81–1
|align=left| Mateusz Filipczak
|style="font-size:88%"|Tech. Fall; 4:10
|-
|Win
|80–1
|align=left| Reineris Salas
|style="font-size:88%"|3–0
|-
|Win
|79–1
|align=left| Vladislav Baitcaev
|style="font-size:88%"|8–7
|style="font-size:88%" rowspan=5|14 June 2017
|style="font-size:88%" rowspan=5|2017 Russian Nationals
|style="text-align:left;font-size:88%;" rowspan=5| Nazran, Ingushetia
|-
|Win
|78–1
|align=left| Tamerlan Rasuev
|style="font-size:88%"|Tech. Fall; 2:51
|-
|Win
|77–1
|align=left| Stanislav Gadzhiev
|style="font-size:88%"|Tech. Fall; 1:27
|-
|Win
|76–1
|align=left| Umar Kudliev
|style="font-size:88%"|Tech. Fall; 0:57
|-
|Win
|75–1
|align=left| Yuri Belonovskiy
|style="font-size:88%"|Tech. Fall; 5:07
|-
|Win
|74–1
|align=left| Selim Yasar
|style="font-size:88%"|5–0
|style="font-size:88%" rowspan=4|20 August 2016 
|style="font-size:88%" rowspan=4|2016 Summer Olympics
|style="text-align:left;font-size:88%;" rowspan=4| Rio de Janeiro
|-
|Win
|73–1
|align=left| Sharif Sharifov
|style="font-size:88%"|8–1
|-
|Win
|72–1
|align=left| Pedro Ceballos
|style="font-size:88%"|5–0
|-
|Win
|71–1
|align=left| István Veréb
|style="font-size:88%"|Tech. Fall; 3:34
|-
|Win
|70–1
|align=left| Zbigniew Baranowski
|style="font-size:88%"| Tech. Fall; 1:36
|style="font-size:88%" rowspan=5|18 June 2016
|style="font-size:88%" rowspan=5|Wenceslas Ziolkowski Memorial LII
|style="text-align:left;font-size:88%;" rowspan=5| Dąbrowa Górnicza
|-
|Win
|69–1
|align=left| Sebastian Jezierzanski
|style="font-size:88%"| Tech. Fall; 2:41
|-
|Win
|68–1
|align=left| István Veréb
|style="font-size:88%"| Tech. Fall; 4:25
|-
|Win
|67–1
|align=left| Omargadzhi Magomedov
|style="font-size:88%"| 7–1
|-
|Win
|66–1
|align=left| Aleksey Mushtin
|style="font-size:88%"| Tech. Fall; 3:25
|-
|Win
|65–1
|align=left|  Irakli Mtsituri
|style="font-size:88%"| Tech. Fall; 5:01
|style="font-size:88%" rowspan=4|3 April 2016 
|style="font-size:88%" rowspan=4|European Championship U23
|style="text-align:left;font-size:88%;" rowspan=4| Ruse
|-
|Win
|64–1
|align=left| Aliaksandr Hushtyn
|style="font-size:88%"| Tech. Fall; 3:27
|-
|Win
|63–1
|align=left| Gergely Gyrits
|style="font-size:88%"| Tech. Fall; 3:26
|-
|Win
|62–1
|align=left| Stefan Reichmuth
|style="font-size:88%"| Tech. Fall; 1:59
|-
|Win
|61–1
|align=left| Elizbar Odikadze
|style="font-size:88%"| Tech. Fall; 5:33
|style="font-size:88%"|7 November 2015 
|style="font-size:88%"|European Nations Cup 2015 (Moscow Lights)
|style="text-align:left;font-size:88%;"| Moscow
|-
|Win
|60–1
|align=left| Selim Yasar
|style="font-size:88%"| 6–0
|style="font-size:88%" rowspan=6|11 September 2015
|style="font-size:88%" rowspan=6|2015 World Championships
|style="text-align:left;font-size:88%;" rowspan=6| Las Vegas, NV
|-
|Win
|59–1
|align=left| Alireza Karimi
|style="font-size:88%"| 6–2
|-
|Win
|58–1
|align=left| Mihail Ganev
|style="font-size:88%"| Tech. Fall; 2:34
|-
|Win
|57–1
|align=left| Orgodolyn Üitümen
|style="font-size:88%"| Tech. Fall; 2:15
|-
|Win
|56–1
|align=left| David Radchenko 
|style="font-size:88%"| Fall; 0:30
|-
|Win
|55–1
|align=left| Shinya Matsumoto
|style="font-size:88%"| Tech. Fall; 3:33
|-
|Win
|54–1
|align=left| Piotr Ianulov
|style="font-size:88%"|Tech. Fall; 1:38
|style="font-size:88%" rowspan=4|18 June 2015
|style="font-size:88%" rowspan=4|2015 European Games
|style="text-align:left;font-size:88%;" rowspan=4| Baku
|-
|Win
|53–1
|align=left| Radosław Marcinkiewicz 
|style="font-size:88%"|Tech. Fall; 2:59
|-
|Win
|52–1
|align=left| Nurmagomed Gadzhiev
|style="font-size:88%"|Tech. Fall; 5:28
|-
|Win
|51–1
|align=left| Tudor Zuz 
|style="font-size:88%"|Tech. Fall; 0:46
|-
|Win
|50–1
|align=left| Shamil Kudiyamagomedov
|style="font-size:88%"|4–0
|style="font-size:88%" rowspan=5|8 May 2015
|style="font-size:88%" rowspan=5|2015 Russian Nationals
|style="text-align:left;font-size:88%;" rowspan=5| Makhachkala, Dagestan
|-
|Win
|49–1
|align=left| Akhmed Magomedov
|style="font-size:88%"|3–0
|-
|Win
|48–1
|align=left| Anzor Urishev
|style="font-size:88%"|7–0
|-
|Win
|47–1
|align=left| Vyacheslav Sugako
|style="font-size:88%"|Tech. Fall
|-
|Win
|46–1
|align=left| Georgy Rubaev
|style="font-size:88%"|5–0
|-
|Win
|45–1
|align=left| Aliaksandr Hushtyn
|style="font-size:88%"|Fall; 0:54
|style="font-size:88%" rowspan=5|7 March 2015
|style="font-size:88%" rowspan=5|Alexander Medved International
|style="text-align:left;font-size:88%;" rowspan=5| Minsk
|-
|Win
|44–1
|align=left| Richard Perry
|style="font-size:88%"|Tech. Fall; 1:55
|-
|Win
|43–1
|align=left| Piotr Ianulov
|style="font-size:88%"|Tech. Fall; 4:02
|-
|Win
|42–1
|align=left| Haji Alijanov
|style="font-size:88%"|5–0
|-
|Win
|41–1
|align=left| Evgeny Aliashkevich
|style="font-size:88%"|Tech. Fall; 3:10
|-
|Win
|40–1
|align=left| Reineris Salas
|style="font-size:88%"|Tech. Fall; 1:25
|style="font-size:88%" rowspan=5|8 September 2014
|style="font-size:88%" rowspan=5|2014 World Championships
|style="text-align:left;font-size:88%;" rowspan=5| Tashkent
|-
|Win
|39–1
|align=left| Aslan Kakhidze
|style="font-size:88%"|Tech. Fall; 0:59
|-
|Win
|38–1
|align=left| Mihail Ganev
|style="font-size:88%"|Tech. Fall; 0:28
|-
|Win
|37–1
|align=left| Dzhambul Tsitadze
|style="font-size:88%"|Tech. Fall; 2:27
|-
|Win
|36–1
|align=left| Selim Yasar
|style="font-size:88%"|9–2
|-
|Win
|35–1
|align=left| István Veréb
|style="font-size:88%"|12–4
|style="font-size:88%" rowspan=5|3 August 2014
|style="font-size:88%" rowspan=5|Wenceslas Ziolkowski Memorial XXIII 
|style="text-align:left;font-size:88%;" rowspan=5| Dąbrowa Górnicza
|-
|Win
|34–1
|align=left| Aliaksandr Hushtyn
|style="font-size:88%"|8–3
|-
|Win
|33–1
|align=left| Zbigniew Baranowski
|style="font-size:88%"|8–3
|-
|Win
|32–1
|align=left| Javad Mohammad Ebrahimi
|style="font-size:88%"|9–3
|-
|Win
|31–1
|align=left| Radosław Marcinkiewicz 
|style="font-size:88%"|3–2
|-
|Win
|30–1
|align=left| Shamil Kudiyamagomedov
|style="font-size:88%"|3–1
|style="font-size:88%" rowspan=5|22 June 2014
|style="font-size:88%" rowspan=5|2014 Russian Nationals
|style="text-align:left;font-size:88%;" rowspan=5| Yakutsk, Sakha
|-
|Win
|29–1
|align=left| Soslan Ktsoyev
|style="font-size:88%"|4–3
|-
|Win
|28–1
|align=left| Dauren Kurugliev
|style="font-size:88%"|4–0
|-
|Win
|27–1
|align=left| Albert Ikaev
|style="font-size:88%"|Tech. Fall
|-
|Win
|26–1
|align=left| Said Dakhkilgov
|style="font-size:88%"|Tech. Fall
|-
|Win
|25–1
|align=left| Murad Gaidarov
|style="font-size:88%"|5–2
|style="font-size:88%" rowspan=5|4 April 2014
|style="font-size:88%" rowspan=5|2014 European Championships
|style="text-align:left;font-size:88%;" rowspan=5| Vantaa
|-
|Win
|24–1
|align=left| István Veréb
|style="font-size:88%"|Tech. Fall; 2:05
|-
|Win
|23–1
|align=left| Dato Marsagishvili
|style="font-size:88%"|Tech. Fall; 4:52
|-
|Win
|22–1
|align=left| Ștefan Gheorghiță
|style="font-size:88%"|Tech. Fall; 1:34
|-
|Win
|21–1
|align=left| Sebastian Jezierzanski 
|style="font-size:88%"|Tech. Fall; 1:29
|-
|Win
|20–1
|align=left| Phil Keddy
|style="font-size:88%"|Tech. Fall; 2:44
|style="font-size:88%" rowspan=5|16 February 2014
|style="font-size:88%" rowspan=5|Golden Grand Prix Yaşar Doğu 2014
|style="text-align:left;font-size:88%;" rowspan=5| Istanbul
|-
|Win
|19–1
|align=left| Clayton Foster 
|style="font-size:88%"|6–2
|-
|Win
|18–1
|align=left| Ahmet Bilici
|style="font-size:88%"|10–10
|-
|Win
|17–1
|align=left| Jalal Zaman
|style="font-size:88%"|Tech. Fall; 5:59
|-
|Win
|16–1
|align=left| Javad Mohammad Ebrahimi
|style="font-size:88%"|8–2
|-
|Win
|15–1
|align=left| Shamil Kudiyamagomedov
|style="font-size:88%"|13–7
|style="font-size:88%" rowspan=5|26 January 2014
|style="font-size:88%" rowspan=5|Golden Grand-Prix Ivan Yarygin 2014
|style="text-align:left;font-size:88%;" rowspan=5| Krasnoyarsk
|-
|Win
|14–1
|align=left| Soslan Ktsoyev
|style="font-size:88%"|4–2
|-
|Win
|13–1
|align=left| Anzor Urishev 
|style="font-size:88%"|4–2
|-
|Win
|12–1
|align=left| Dauren Kurugliev
|style="font-size:88%"|4–0
|-
|Win
|11–1
|align=left| Shamil Katinovasov
|style="font-size:88%"|Tech. Fall
|-
|Win
|10–1
|align=left| Alexander Gostiev
|style="font-size:88%"|5–4
|style="font-size:88%" rowspan=3|22 November 2013
|style="font-size:88%" rowspan=3|Memorial Heydar Aliyev 2013
|style="text-align:left;font-size:88%;" rowspan=3| Baku
|-
|Win
|9–1
|align=left| Keith Gavin
|style="font-size:88%"|Tech. Fall; 5:05
|-
|Loss
|8–1
|align=left| Gamzat Osmanov
|style="font-size:88%"|Tech. Fall; 1:42
|-
|Win
|8–0
|align=left| Muhammed Enes Altun
|style="font-size:88%"|Fall; 0:46
|style="font-size:88%" rowspan=4|24 August 2013
|style="font-size:88%" rowspan=4|2013 Cadet World Championships
|style="text-align:left;font-size:88%;" rowspan=4| Zrenjanin
|-
|Win
|7–0
|align=left| Nurmagomed Gadzhiev
|style="font-size:88%"|Tech. Fall; 0:20 (2)
|-
|Win
|6–0
|align=left| Hossein Shahbazi-Gazvar
|style="font-size:88%"|Tech. Fall; 1:51
|-
|Win
|5–0
|align=left| Peaveen Praveen
|style="font-size:88%"|Tech. Fall; 0:59
|-
|Win
|4–0
|align=left| Ruslan Ruchko
|style="font-size:88%"|12–9
|style="font-size:88%" rowspan=4|22 August 2012
|style="font-size:88%" rowspan=4|2012 Cadet World Championships
|style="text-align:left;font-size:88%;" rowspan=4| Baku
|-
|Win
|3–0
|align=left| Turmunkh Ganbold
|style="font-size:88%"|Tech. Fall; 1:35 (2)
|-
|Win
|2–0
|align=left| Shota Shirai
|style="font-size:88%"|9–2
|-
|Win
|1–0
|align=left| Faruh Sharipov
|style="font-size:88%"|Tech. Fall; 0:23 (2)
|-

Awards

Order of Honour (11 September 2021)
Master of Sports of International Class (25 March 2019)
Hero of Dagestan (18 November 2018)
Master of Sports (17 October 2016)
Order of Friendship (25 August 2016)
Order of Merit for the Republic of Dagestan (26 August 2016)
Order of Honour "Al-Fakhr" (26 August 2016)
Merited Master of Sports (11 April 2016)
Master of Sports of International Class (5 August 2015)
Master of Sports of International Class (18 September 2014)
In June 2015, Sadulaev was voted best Russian sportsman of June at the TV project "Golden Pedestal" (on the now-defunct Rossiya 2), earning 55.6% of votes and trumping Aliya Mustafina, who got 44.4% of votes.

References

External links
 
 
 
 

Avar people
Living people
1996 births
Olympic gold medalists for Russia
Wrestlers at the 2016 Summer Olympics
Olympic medalists in wrestling
European Games gold medalists for Russia
European Games medalists in wrestling
Wrestlers at the 2015 European Games
Wrestlers at the 2019 European Games
Russian male sport wrestlers
World Wrestling Championships medalists
People from Charodinsky District
Russian Muslims
Russian people of Dagestani descent
Medalists at the 2016 Summer Olympics
European Wrestling Championships medalists
Wrestlers at the 2020 Summer Olympics
Medalists at the 2020 Summer Olympics
Olympic gold medalists for the Russian Olympic Committee athletes
European Wrestling Champions
Sportspeople from Dagestan
World Wrestling Champions